Kalidiatou Niakaté (born 15 March 1995) is a French handball player for CSM București and the French national team.  

Her team placed second at the 2012/13 Cup Winners' Cup and 2013/14 Challenge Cup.

References

External links

1995 births
Living people
French female handball players
Sportspeople from Aubervilliers
European champions for France
Handball players at the 2020 Summer Olympics
Medalists at the 2020 Summer Olympics
Olympic medalists in handball
Olympic gold medalists for France